Cold Therapy is an Dark-industrial / dark electronic music project from Poland, founded by Jacek Wolański on October 8, 2012. Music of Cold Therapy is known for its dark and atmospheric sound - "A soundtrack to the dark side of your mind”.

History 
Wolański began releasing music in 2009, releasing several albums with two different bands before founding Cold Therapy.

At first, he started making Dark Ambient music (never officially released) with his two-man group Unsinn, where he was the composer and vocalist. Finally, they ended up making Aggrotech / EBM music and released one official album in 2010. Shortly after that, his work on Unsinn ended in a controversial manner: "[H]e removed me from the band, took all rights, without mentioning about it. He said and wrote everywhere that I left the band by myself. And that was the end of our cooperation."

The second band in which Wolański was involved was Traumatize. Another Aggrotech / EBM project, which concentrated more on making music suitable for dancefloors and DJ sets. As Traumatize, from 2010 to the end of 2012 he released 3 full albums, 1 EP and 1 single, mostly with the Spanish record label Mutant-E Records.

After few years of album releases, Wolański felt tired of the aggressive, club-oriented style of music and in need of a change, founded Cold Therapy. This was the moment he decided to make more old-school Dark Electronic music.

He stated in an interview: "This time I wanted to make something different, something more 'personal', more into my own musical tastes, to express myself."

After the first album Embrace the Silence, the band was joined by a new main vocalist, Jan R., and female secondary vocalist Jen. They then released the  EP Carnival of Lies and the full album Masquerade Infinite. But on March 10, 2016, both left Cold Therapy and Wolański returned to working solo. On November 14, 2016, he released another full-length album, Figures and Faces.

Masquerade Infinite is currently the most successful release of Cold Therapy has received many positive reviews, for example from Side-Line Magazine, which stated: "Cold Therapy clearly strives to compose a personal sound. The haunting atmospheres hanging over the songs is poignant and definitely the main force and characteristic of this work" and Brutal Resonance: "Here, Cold Therapy have created a sound that spans across quite a few eras of electro-industrial evolution."

Masquerade Infinite reached 4th position on the German Electronic Charts (GEWC) and entered the TOP 50 Bestsellers ranking on POPoNAUT, being in 43rd place.

Cold Therapy appeared on various compilations and is well known for collaborations and remixes done for other artists, such as Suicide Commando, Wumpscut, Acylum, Shiv-r, A7ie, Die Braut, nolongerhuman, and Hydroxie.

Record label 
Cold Therapy has been signed to Advoxya Records since March 22, 2015.

Discography

Albums 

 2013 - Embrace the Silence
 2015 - Masquerade Infinite
 2016 - Figures and Faces
 2018 - The Darkest Hour

EP 
 2014- Carnival of Lies

Side release series 
 2017 - Behind the Scenes: Vol. 01

Remix appearances

2012 
 Terrortek X - Bio Chemical Warfare

2013 
 nolongerhuman - Introvert
 Nano Infect - Scars Of Denial
 Aggroaphobia - Obsessive Mind
 RSM - Roznieś Swoje Mocarstwo
 Corroded Master - Wir Sind Viele
 Projekt LR - God Bless All Murderers
 Subliminal Noize - Happy End Of The World
 At0shima 3rr0r - Beyond the horizon

2014 
 Wumpscut - Bulwark Bazooka
 A7ie - Distress V2.0 (digital / exclusive edition)
 Die Braut - Parricida Perpetuo
 Advent Resilience - Atavism
 Proyecto Crisis - Under Control
 impurfekt - repurfekt II
 Obsidian FX - Phlegm
 Hasswut - Wir sind...
 Reactor7x - Sick of it all
 AudioCentesis - Zughenruhe
 VA - CRL Studios Presents: The Fourth Wavelength (Lost) – remix for Biomechanimal
 At0shima 3rr0r - Silent One

2015 
 Wumpscut - Blutspuker Tavern
 Acylum - Zigeunerjunge
 Acylum - Venom
 Shiv-r - Eye of the Needle
 Hydroxie - Seelenschmerz
 Studio-X vs Simon Carter - Ad Astra Volantis
 reADJUST - Kontrollverlust
 Viscera Drip - Perpetual Adversity + Remixes (2CD edition)
 Device Noize - Tabues Remixed
 lucidstatic - You Are Here
 Uncarnate - Weak protein life
 F.T.C. - I'm Not Crazy
 The Dark Butterfly - Alles oder Nichts
 BlutKraft - Leave the Dancefloor

2016 
 A7ie - Narcissick Volume II
 Homicidal Feelings - Cognitive Disorders
 Subliminal Code - Soldier Of Hell, Reborn
 Promidal - Simul iustus et peccator : : THE REMIXES : :
 Binary Division - Defcon 1

2017 
 Suicide Commando - Forest Of The Impaled (Limited Edition)
 Vore Complex - Hate Tusk
 Antibody - Opera Of Death
 WANT/ed & Miranda Cartel - My Pride
 Electro Fear - The Little Shop Of Horrors
 Taxon Lazare - Chinatown / Чайнатаун

2018 

 Benjamin'sPlague - Perfectly Hideous
 Vore Complex - Mewl

Guest appearances

2013 
 Vault-113 - Cold Fusion
 FF.AA - Reorganización Nacional
 FF.AA - Mission Failed
 A.D.N - Salvation of God
 A.D.N - The Singularity (B-sides)
 A.D.N - My end (B-sides remix)
 A.D.N - All die Bastards
 VA - Tactical Tracks 2nd Assault – song: 13th Angel  - Purgatory (feat. Cold Therapy)

2014 
 Universally Unnecessary - The Uprising

2015 
 VA - Side-Line - Face The Beat: Session 2 – song: Traumatize - Bound by Hell (feat. Cold Therapy)
 VA - Elektro Villain: Volume 005 – song: Traumatize - Bound by Hell (feat. Cold Therapy)
 Acervus - Something Beautiful
 VA - Mechanized - Best Of 2015 – song: A.[D].N - Was Pain (Feat Cold Therapy)
 London Sadness - Confession
 VA - Halotan Records -Sampler 08 – song: 13th Angel - Purgatory (feat. Cold Therapy)

2016 
 VA - Seasons of Electronics Vol. I – song: Traumatize - Bound by Hell (feat. Cold Therapy)

2017 
 Fredrik Croona - This Is Goodbye
 VA - darkTunes - Gothic Music Orgy Vol.4 – song: Plague Doctor - I'm coming to take you away (feat. Cold Therapy)
 VA - Elektro Villain: Volume 007 – song: Plague Doctor - I'm coming to take you away (feat. Cold Therapy)
 VA - Brutal Resonance - It's September – song: Acervus - Far, Far Away (feat. Cold Therapy)

2019 

 Plague Doctor - Reborn

Compilation appearances

2012 
 Digital Recovery: Part 1
 Tactical Beats (Winter Ops)
 Freak Machine 0.2

2013 
 Infraschall Vol.5
 Halotan Records - Sampler 05
 Halotan Records - Sampler 06
 Halotan Records - Sampler 07
 Tactical Tracks 2nd Assault
 EBM ADDICTION 10,000 Vol. II
 EBM ADDICTION [VOL 3]
 Dance 4 Syria - Vol.2 - Industrial

2014 
 Beat:Cancer V2
 Digital Recovery: Part 10.4
 DJ Led Manville - Nachtplan Tanz Vol.17
 CRL Studios Presents: While You Were Out Vol. 2
 CRL Studios Presents: Power Beyond Fathom (A Benefit For Don Hill Of Millipede) Part 3
 Elektro Villain: Volume 002
 NAR Goth`N`Tronic Sampler Vol.3

2015 
 Side-Line - Face The Beat: Session 2
 Digital Recovery: Part 11.2
 Project Industrial: Underground Machines
 Freak Machine 0.3
 Halotan Records - Sampler 08
 Halotan Records - Halotan Sounds 2.0
 Elektro Villain: Volume 005
 Freak Machine 0.4
 Mechanized - Best Of 2015

2016 
 Side-Line - Face The Beat: Session 4
 Side-Line - Face The Beat: Session 3
 darkTunes - Gothic Music Orgy Vol.3
 darkTunes - Gothic Music Orgy Vol.2
 Body Virus
 Intravenous Magazine - Blood Pack Vol. 3
 Seasons of Electronics Vol. I
 CIA Volume 2

2017 
 darkTunes - Gothic Music Orgy Vol.4
 Freak Machine 0.5
 Brutal Resonance - It's September
 Brutal Resonance - June 2017
 Elektro Villain: Volume 007

2018 

 Insane Records - Terror Night Vol.4 Digital Prophecy For Cyber Harvest
 Brutal Resonance - We Love Industrial
 Intravenous Magazine - Blood Pack Vol. 5
 Dark Electro Polska Vol. 1
 Brutal Resonance - There's a Lot of Industrial on This Compilation
 Russian Dark Community - Compilation vol . 1
 Russian Dark Community - Digital Virus
Brutal Resonance - Happy Goffmas

2019 

Alfa Matrix - Endzeit Bunkertracks [act 8] - the bonus tracks

References

External links 
 

Electro-industrial music groups
Polish industrial music groups
Polish electronic music groups
Musical groups established in 2012
2012 establishments in Poland